Mindhunter: Inside the FBI's Elite Serial Crime Unit is a 1995 non-fiction crime book written by retired FBI agent John E. Douglas and his co-author Mark Olshaker.

Description
The book details Douglas's "criminal-personality profiling" on serial killers and mass murderers, which he developed over decades of interviews with known killers. The book includes profiles of the Atlanta child killer, David Carpenter, Edmund Kemper, Robert Hansen, and Larry Gene Bell, and suggests proactive steps on luring culprits to contact the police.

Adaptation
In 2017, the Netflix series Mindhunter began production, and drew inspiration heavily from the book.

References

External links
 Mindhunter Google Books

1995 non-fiction books
American non-fiction books
Books about violence
Works about rape
Works about stalking
Non-fiction books about serial killers
Books about the Federal Bureau of Investigation
Non-fiction books adapted into television shows
Collaborative non-fiction books